Mitropoli (before 1915: Παληόκαστρον - Paliokastron) is a village and a former municipality in the Karditsa regional unit, Thessaly, Greece. Since the 2011 local government reform it is part of the municipality Karditsa, of which it is a municipal unit. The municipal unit has an area of 57.894 km2. Population 3,332 (2011). The village, the site of the ancient city of Metropolis, was renamed in 1915 to reflect the association.

References

Populated places in Karditsa (regional unit)